The Detectives is a Canadian television docudrama series, which premiered on CBC Television on January 10, 2018. Covering true crime stories, the series blends interviews with real police detectives who investigated the crimes with scripted dramatic reenactments.

Episodes

Season 1 (2018)

Season 2 (2018)

Season 3 (2020)

References

External links

CBC Television original programming
2018 Canadian television series debuts
2010s Canadian crime television series
2000s Canadian documentary television series
Canadian television docudramas
True crime television series
English-language television shows